Kevin James Dynon (11 August 1925 – 8 September 2017) was an Australian rules footballer who played for the North Melbourne Football Club in the Australian Football League (VFL).

Early years
Dynon was brought up in Kensington, Victoria and attended St. Joseph's CBC North Melbourne between 1936 and 1940 where he attained his Intermediate Certificate.  He was noted for his overall athletic prowess and exceptional sporting ability which allowed him to become a member of the school's tennis, cricket, handball and football teams at various times. In 1940 he earned the title of college captain and was the senior sports champion, winning the 90 yards hurdles, broad jump, high jump and coming second in the 100 yards sprint (under 16). In the same year he acted as captain of the handball team and the athletics squad.

Military
Barely 18 years of age, he enlisted into the Royal Australian Air Force and served in the AFHQ Telecommunication Unit until his discharge as a leading aircraftman in March 1946. During his war service he survived a cyclone in Exmouth, Western Australia by sheltering under a truck after all the base buildings had been blown away. Following his discharge he resumed work in the Federal Public Service.

Football career
Dynon was appointed captain of North Melbourne Football Club in 1947 at age 21, the youngest captain of the club until 1972 when David Dench was appointed at just 20. In 1951, playing with the North Old Boys', he was part of the team which won the Premiership in the Combined Catholic Old Collegians' Association.

In 1952 and 1953 he renewed his captaincy of the Kangaroos, five years after being first appointed.

In 1955 Dynon joined Moorabbin Football Club, in the Victorian Football Association (VFA) as captain-coach.

References

External links

 

1925 births
North Melbourne Football Club players
Moorabbin Football Club players
Moorabbin Football Club coaches
Australian rules footballers from Melbourne
2017 deaths
Royal Australian Air Force personnel of World War II
Royal Australian Air Force airmen
Military personnel from Melbourne
People from Kensington, Victoria
People educated at St Joseph's College, Melbourne